Val de Virvée is a commune in the Gironde department of southwestern France. The municipality was established on 1 January 2016 and consists of the former communes of Aubie-et-Espessas, Saint-Antoine and Salignac.

Population

See also 
Communes of the Gironde department

References 

Communes of Gironde